Cecilia Widegren (born 1973) is a Swedish politician of the Moderate Party. She has been a member of the Riksdag since 2002.

References

Exrernal links
Cecilia Widegren at the Riksdag website

Members of the Riksdag from the Moderate Party
Living people
1973 births
Women members of the Riksdag
Members of the Riksdag 2002–2006
21st-century Swedish women politicians